Alan da Silva Souza (born 9 December 1987 in Andirá, Paraná) is a Brazilian midfielder who last played for Balzan.

Personal life
Alan has a younger brother Leonardo who is also a professional football player.

Statistics

References

External links

 Information and photo of Alan da Silva Souza at arsenal-kiev.com.ua
 CBF 
 
 

1987 births
Living people
Brazilian footballers
Brazilian expatriate footballers
FC Arsenal Kyiv players
FC Metalurh Donetsk players
FC Stal Alchevsk players
AEK Larnaca FC players
FC Bukovyna Chernivtsi players
Valletta F.C. players
Ergotelis F.C. players
Ukrainian Premier League players
Ukrainian First League players
Super League Greece players
Cypriot First Division players
Expatriate footballers in Cyprus
Expatriate footballers in Ukraine
Brazilian expatriate sportspeople in Cyprus
Brazilian expatriate sportspeople in Ukraine
Expatriate footballers in Greece
Expatriate footballers in Malta
Association football midfielders